Louise Pershing (May 24, 1904- October 14, 1986) was an American painter and sculptor, and a founder of the Pittsburgh Center for the Arts.

Career 
Pershing studied at the Pennsylvania Academy of the Fine Arts, the Carnegie Institute of Technology (now Carnegie Mellon University), and the University of Pittsburgh. While at the Carnegie Institute, she worked with Giovanni Romagnoli and Alexander Kostellow, among others.

Exhibitions 
Pershing exhibited extensively, beginning in 1927 with the Associated Artists of Pittsburgh. One of her paintings, "Seedlings," was included in the 1937 Carnegie International, and her work was also part of the 1949 and 1950 Internationals.

She also had several solo exhibitions. Exhibition of Paintings by Louise Pershing appeared at the Carnegie Institute between March 19-April 26, 1942.

Awards 
Pershing's painting, Coal Tipple earned the Margaret Cooper Prize at the 45th Annual Exhibition of the National Association of Women Painters and Sculptors in 1936.

References 

1904 births
1986 deaths
20th-century American women artists
Artists from Pittsburgh 
Pennsylvania Academy of the Fine Arts alumni, 
Carnegie Mellon University alumni and the 
University of Pittsburgh alumni